Jyoti Rout (born July 15, 1965) is an Indian classical dancer, teacher and choreographer of Odissi dancing style.

Early life and background
Jyoti Rout grew up in the remote town of Joda in Odisha, India. Her interest in dance began in her childhood, where she used to see local tribal dance programs during various festivals. She later received a master's degree in Odissi dance from the music and dance college Utkal Sangeet Mahavidyalaya in Bhubaneswar, Odisha, and was one of the first women to study and perform Chau dance, a martial art dance form from Odisha.

Career
In 1993, Jyoti Rout became the first dancer to perform for Lord Jagannath in Puri, Odisha, after the Deva Dasi (temple dancer) tradition had ended under the British rule. In 1997, she founded the California-based Odissi dance school Jyoti Kala Mandir, College of Indian Classical Arts, which is currently based in Fremont, California, USA. In 2012, she established a branch in Lingipur Bhubaneswar, Odisha, India.

Awards
 Outstanding choreography from the Ethnic Dance Festival, San Francisco, 2006. 
 Pride of India National Award
 Shri Kshetra Mahari, Puri, Odisha.
 Shrestha Odiani, Cuttack, Odisha.
 Kalashree by OSA, USA.
 Nirtya Siromani by Olympiad Odisha.
 Nirtya Shree State Award by Madhur Jhankar, Bhubaneswar, Odisha.
 Odisha Diary's "Odisha Living Legend Award" for her contribution to the art form in two continents, Bhubaneswar, Odisha, 2016.
Mahari Award from Guru Pankaj Charan Das foundation, Odisha, 2017

References

Odissi exponents
Indian female classical dancers
Performers of Indian classical dance
Indian classical choreographers
Indian women choreographers
Indian choreographers
Dancers from Odisha
20th-century Indian dancers
20th-century Indian women artists
Women artists from Odisha
1965 births
Living people